Princess Henry may refer to:

Princess Beatrice of the United Kingdom (1857–1944), wife of Prince Henry of Battenberg
Princess Irene of Hesse and by Rhine (1866–1953), wife of Prince Henry of Prussia
Princess Alice, Duchess of Gloucester (1901–2004), wife of Prince Henry, Duke of Gloucester
Meghan, Duchess of Sussex (born 1981), wife of Prince Henry, Duke of Sussex